Robert Manuel Enes (born 22 August 1975) is an Australian former soccer player who played at both professional and international levels as a midfielder.

Club career
Enes spent his youth career with Shepparton United, Preston Makedonia and the Australian Institute of Sport. He spent his senior career with Preston Lions,
Melbourne SC, Sydney United, Portsmouth, Northern Spirit and Marconi Stallions.

International career
Enes represented the Australian under-20 team at the 1995 FIFA World Youth Championship, and the under-23 team at the 1996 Summer Olympics. He also earned seven caps for the senior team.

References

1975 births
Living people
Australian soccer players
Preston Lions FC players
Australian Institute of Sport soccer players
Brunswick Juventus players
Sydney United 58 FC players
Portsmouth F.C. players
Northern Spirit FC players
Marconi Stallions FC players
National Soccer League (Australia) players
English Football League players
Association football midfielders
Australia under-20 international soccer players
Olympic soccer players of Australia
1996 OFC Nations Cup players
Footballers at the 1996 Summer Olympics
Australia international soccer players
Australian expatriate soccer players
Expatriate footballers in England
Australian expatriate sportspeople in England